Trust (stylized as trust_) is a 2010 American drama thriller film directed by David Schwimmer and based on a screenplay by Andy Bellin and Robert Festinger, and an uncredited story by Schwimmer. It stars Clive Owen, Catherine Keener, Viola Davis, Jason Clarke, and Liana Liberato.

The film is about a fourteen-year-old girl who becomes a victim of sexual abuse when she befriends a man on the Internet.

Plot
For her fourteenth birthday, Annie Cameron receives a laptop from her parents, Will and Lynn, and she soon meets a boy named Charlie in an online chat room. Charlie initially claims to be 16 years old, but eventually confesses that he is 20, and then 25. Annie is taken aback at first, but comes to believe that the two of them are in love. After two months of communicating electronically, Charlie invites Annie to meet him at the mall. When he arrives, she discovers that he is actually a man in his late 30s. Charlie convinces the distressed and uncomfortable Annie to have ice cream with him at a café. Annie later accompanies Charlie to a motel, where he makes her try on lingerie he bought her before raping her, filming the ordeal. At school, Annie's best friend Brittany confronts her, having seen her with Charlie at the mall, later notifying the school administration. The police arrive and depart with Annie, drawing attention from other students. The events initiate an FBI investigation, lead by Agent Doug Tate.

The FBI have Annie call Charlie in an attempt to identify him, but he figures out the ruse and blocks her number before they can trace his location. Will hires a private investigation firm in New Jersey to catch Charlie, but this proves fruitless when they realize he masks his IP address so that his location shows up as the Czech Republic. As his obsession with catching Charlie deepens, Will's relationship with his family becomes strained and he begins questioning his work at an advertising firm, which often uses provocative images of teenagers in their advertisements. Annie begins to see hospital counselor Gail Friedman, with whom she confides that she loves Charlie and believes Charlie loves her too. Annie later goes back to school. Brittany tries to apologize, but Annie orders Brittany to never speak to her again.

Days later, Charlie has still not been identified, but DNA evidence proves he has previously sexually abused several other young girls. After seeing pictures of Charlie's victims, Annie flees her home and seeks consolation from Friedman, before finally admitting to herself that she was raped. The next day, Annie tries to move on with her life by participating in her school's volleyball game. Will sees a man in the crowd taking pictures, whom Will mistakes as one of the men from the registered sex offender list. Will violently confronts him, but he turns out to be the father of one of Annie's teammates. The assaulted man chooses not to press charges, realizing that in doing so he will inadvertently reveal that he is a sexual predator. Will apologizes to the man but Annie feels humiliated. She confronts her father and insists that she just wants to move on with her life.

Annie hears from Brittany about a website in which people are belittling the fact that she was raped and posting photo manipulations of her in pornographic poses, as well as revealing her phone number and address. She locks herself in the bathroom at home and attempts suicide by overdosing with pills, unbeknownst to her father, who is still at home. A panicked call from Lynn leads Will to search the house for a semi-conscious Annie. Will forces Annie to vomit up the pills, and she is rushed to a nearby hospital. Brittany spends the night to keep her company, mending their broken friendship. Annie wakes up early the next day and discovers her father sitting outside in the freezing cold. He admits that he blames himself for not doing enough to protect her and pleads for her forgiveness, even though he believes he does not deserve it. Annie starts to cry and then embraces him. A home video reveals that Charlie is actually a high school physics teacher named Graham Weston, and that he has a wife and a young son.

Cast
 Liana Liberato as Annie Cameron
 Clive Owen as Will Cameron, Lynn's husband and Annie's father 
 Catherine Keener as Lynn Cameron, Will's wife and Annie's mother 
 Viola Davis as Gail Friedman, a hospital counselor
 Jason Clarke as Doug Tate, an FBI agent
 Chris Henry Coffey as "Charlie" / Graham Weston, the older man Annie meets online 
 Noah Emmerich as Al Hart, Will's boss
 Spencer Curnutt as Peter Cameron, Will and Lynn's son and Annie's older brother
 Aislinn Debutch as Katie Cameron, Will and Lynn's youngest daughter and Annie's younger sister
 Zoe Levin as Brittany, Annie's best friend

Production
In an interview Schwimmer stated that he always wanted Annie to be played by a 14-year-old, as "there is a danger, if you cast someone who is 18, 19 or 20 to play 14 or 15, that very subtly, almost unconsciously, the audience is, 'Oh, this isn't so bad.'" He based the film on 14 years of involvement with The Rape Foundation and seven years of research. The scene where Annie is raped was filmed as late as possible, to ensure a "really safe environment for Liana." In the seven years of development, about 50 drafts of the script were written.

Release
The film premiered at the 2010 Toronto International Film Festival.

Reception

Box office
Out of its $4 million budget, Trust earned only $120,016 in North America and $475,423 internationally, for a worldwide gross of $595,439.

Critical response
Trust received positive reviews from critics. , the film holds a 79% approval rating on Rotten Tomatoes, based on 66 reviews with an average rating of 6.7 out of 10. The critical consensus states: "Director David Schwimmer gets some gut-wrenching performances out of his actors but he still lacks the chops to fully ratchet up story tension." The film also has a score of 60 out of 100 on Metacritic based on 18 critics indicating mixed or average reviews.

In his review, Roger Ebert of the Chicago Sun-Times gave the film four stars out of four and stated: "The bravest thing about David Schwimmer's 'Trust' is that it doesn't try to simplify. It tells its story of a 14-year-old girl and a predatory pedophile as a series of repercussions in which rape is only the first, and possibly not the worst, tragedy to strike its naive and vulnerable victim. It's easy to imagine how this story could have been exploited and dumbed down. It works instead with intelligence and sympathy."

References

External links
 
 
 
 
 

2010 films
2010 independent films
2010s teen drama films
2010 thriller drama films
American independent films
American teen drama films
American thriller drama films
Films about child sexual abuse
Films set in Chicago
Films shot in Chicago
Films shot in Michigan
Films about rape
Films directed by David Schwimmer
Films about the Federal Bureau of Investigation
2010 drama films
Films about cyberbullying
2010s English-language films
2010s American films